Aníbal Ovidio Huerta Díaz is a Peruvian politician. He is a former Congressman representing Huánuco for the period 2006–2011, and belongs to the Peruvian Aprista Party.

References

Living people
American Popular Revolutionary Alliance politicians
Members of the Congress of the Republic of Peru
Year of birth missing (living people)